Al Hoceima is a Riffian city in the north of Morocco, on the northern edge of the Rif Mountains and on the Mediterranean coast. It is the capital city of the Al Hoceïma Province. It is situated in the territory of the Ait Waryagher and Ibaqouyen tribes of the Rif region, who speak a Riffian variety of the Berber language locally called Tmaziɣt or Tarifit. The city is a known tourist destination despite its small size. It has a population of about 56,716 according to the 2014 census.

Al Hoceima is cited among the cleanest and safest Moroccan cities. It is characterised by its shining sandy beaches like Cala Iris, Bades, Torres, Quemado, and Tala Youssef, and its mountainous rocky areas. Parts of Al Hoceima are currently being integrated into the municipality through the construction of new roads to ease transportation.

Name
The name Al Hoceima is paradoxically an Arabisation of what was already an Arabic derived word introduced by the Spaniards, since it comes from a Spanish word (Alhucemas – literally meaning "Lavenders") which is itself Andalusi in Arabic origin (Al Khazama). After independence, the Moroccan government established an Arabised name for Alhucemas coming up with Al Hoceima, following the standard French spelling.

History

Early and colonial history
The Berber tribe of the Ait Ouriaghel (also "Beni Urriaguel") dominated the area around Al Hoceima, where Abd el-Krim, whose father was a qadi of the Aith Yusuf clan of the Ait Ouriaghel tribe, organised a guerilla force to fight against the Spanish during the Rif War and, in 1921, established the Republic of the Rif. In September 1925 Spanish General José Sanjurjo landed with his troops on the beach of Al Hoceima and claimed the territory for Spain.

The Spanish developed the town and named it Villa Sanjurjo, for general Sanjurjo. It was later renamed Al Hoceima. The first mayor was Florian Gómez Aroca.

Since Moroccan independence

After Morocco gained its independence in 1955, Al Hoceima developed quickly, and the Moroccan government changed its name from the Spanish Villa Alhucemas to Al Hoceima.

The years from 1956 to 1959 were dark years for the Riffians. Morocco's Hassan II, then crown-prince, became the military-commander and under his ruling a large number of people were killed in the Rif in the years 1956 to 1959. The Beni Urriaguel rose up against the central administration in October 1958, and 2/3 of the army of Morocco, led by Hassan, landed at Al Hoceima.

In the early 1950s and 1960s, when many of the city's inhabitants were poor, the small houses were all painted white and blue. These colours, representing the sea and sky, were considered the city's official colours. Later, when there was financial growth, people began painting their houses in other colours.

The city and surrounding villages were hit by two large earthquakes within ten years. The first ( 6.0 event occurred on May 26, 1994, and the second event ( 6.4) occurred on February 24, 2004, killing more than 560 people (see 2004 Al Hoceima earthquake). In 2007, Al Hoceima's mayor stated that all new houses would be painted white and blue in an effort to restore the city's traditional appearance.

Al Hoceima is now a moderate-size city with a population of 56,716 recorded in the 2014 Moroccan census. It has the second-largest port of the Rif region (Nador being the largest). The first schools built by the Spanish colonials, (a college and an elementary school) and a Spanish catholic church, still exist today.

Playa Quemado, where General Sanjurjo and his troops landed in 1925, is Al Hoceima's most popular beach. It is located just below the luxurious Mohammed V hotel, which includes a tennis court, restaurant, cocktail bar and nightclub.

Al Hoceima has been the centre of repression by and political protest against the Moroccan government in the 21st century. Five young protesters were murdered, and their burned bodies found in Al Hoceima, in 2011. On October 28, 2016, a fish-seller, Mouhcine Fikri, was crushed to death in a rubbish truck while trying to retrieve fish confiscated by the authorities, which led to large anti-government protests in November 2016 known as Hirak Rif. Protests in Al Hoceima continued after the start of Ramadan, 26 May, and culminated on 26 June with "bloody clashes", then spreading to other parts of northern Morocco and the country. On 7 January 2023, A 5.3 Magnitude Earthquake hit Al Hoceima Province, Nekkour. On 12 February 2023, National Institute of Geophysics announced two earthquakes that occurred in the Al Hoceima region, in the north of the country, measuring 3.8 and 4.3 degrees.

Climate

Economy
The city's income is based on fishing and tourism. Many of its former inhabitants migrated to Europe during the 1960s through 1980s; large numbers of Moroccans in the Netherlands, France and Belgium were Al Hoceima natives, many of whom return to Al Hoceima during the summer, when the town is also frequented by tourists from Germany and France.

The town beach is Plage Quemado, which is also where fishers bring in their catch. A quieter beach is in nearby Asfiha. The Torres de Alcala and Kalah Iris beaches are also considered Al Hoceima beaches, though they are 60 km from town.

Transport 
The city is served by the Cherif Al Idrissi Airport.

Education 
There is a Spanish international school, Instituto Español Melchor de Jovellanos.

Abdelmalek Essaâdi University - Campus of Al Hoceima contains:

Faculty of Science and Technology - FST

National School of Applied Sciences - ENSA'H

Multidisciplinary Faculty - FPH (Under Construction)

National School of Commerce and Management - ENCG (Under Construction)

Notable people 
Nasser Zefzafi, Moroccan political activist 
Jamal Ben Saddik, Moroccan kickboxer
Tarik Elyounoussi, Norwegian footballer of Moroccan origins.
Mohamed Elyounoussi, Norwegian footballer of Moroccan origins.
Ibrahim Afellay, Dutch Former footballer of Moroccan origins.
Khalid Boulahrouz, Dutch Former footballer of Moroccan origins.
Isam Bachiri, Danish Singer of Moroccan origins
Mohamed Oulhaj, Moroccan footballer
Ilyas El Omari, Moroccan politician

Twin towns – sister cities
 Nice, France
 Tuzla, Bosnia and Herzegovina
 Almería, Spain
 Almuñécar, Spain
 The Hague, Netherlands
 Meppel, Netherlands
 Schaerbeek, Belgium
 Sint-Niklaas, Belgium

See also
 Rif
 Spanish protectorate in Morocco

References

External links

 Nador Rif News; www.ariffino.net
Al Hoceima Photos (La page Facebook)
Al Hoceima Photos (English)
City Of Alhoceima Website (English)
Galerie Al Hoceima (FR)
   Alhoceima, la perle de la Méditerranée'
   Www. Alhoceima.info Portal de información de la ciudad de Alhoceima'
Top things to do in Al Hoceima

Populated places in Al Hoceïma Province
Municipalities of Morocco
Mediterranean port cities and towns in Morocco
Rif
Provincial capitals in Morocco
Berber populated places